Constantin Pigla Sintat Brachet (born May 7, 1990), also known as Constantin Pigla, is a Cameroonian footballer who played for Paniliakos F.C. in the Football League (Greece) as a forward.

Career

References

External links
 
 

1990 births
Living people
Cameroonian footballers
Cameroonian expatriate footballers
Expatriate footballers in Cameroon
Expatriate footballers in Greece
Canon Yaoundé players
Paniliakos F.C. players
Association football forwards